Rodrigo René González Torres (26 September 1941 – 4 September 2022) was a Chilean politician. He served as Second Vice President of the Chamber of Deputies of Chile and as a member of the Chamber of Deputies representing District 7 of the Valparaíso Region. He previously served twice as mayor of Viña del Mar.

References

1941 births
2022 deaths
Members of the Chamber of Deputies of Chile
Mayors of Viña del Mar
Pontifical Catholic University of Valparaíso alumni
University of Paris alumni
Party for Democracy (Chile) politicians
Popular Unitary Action Movement politicians
People from Viña del Mar
Municipal councillors of Viña del Mar
20th-century Chilean people
21st-century Chilean people